is a Japanese comic duo from Osaka working for Shōchiku Geinō, the second largest comedy talent agency in Japan following Yoshimoto Kōgyō.

Yowiko are known otakus, even appearing on the variety show LINCOLN cosplaying as Char Aznable and Amuro Ray of the Gundam anime series and taking Downtown to Akihabara.

Members 
 Born February 25, 1972, in Osaka. Plays the boke. Married in 2004 and has two children. Enjoys video games and anime. He has received significant popularity in Akihabara in recent years due to his show Game Center CX, in which he plays through retro games. Because of this, he finds himself being called Kachō (meaning "section chief," it is his official "position" in Game Center CX) more and more often. He also has contributed to the commentary for a special edition Japanese Blu-ray of Scott Pilgrim Vs. the World. A Mii mock-up of him was also made for the Japanese announcement trailer of Mii Fighters for Super Smash Bros. for Nintendo 3DS and Wii U. He appears as an unlockable costume in Super Mario Maker.
 Born January 29, 1972, in Konohana-ku, Osaka. Plays the tsukkomi. Enjoys online games. Has recently joined Arino in playing games with Arino more often for newer games like Minecraft and Super Mario Odyssey. He is married to Akina Minami as of May, 2018.

The duo (kombi) was originally formed under the pretense of Shinya Arino as the boke (stooge) and Masaru Hamaguchi as the tsukkomi (straightman), but as time went on and Hamaguchi's "natural stupidness" started to shine through, the duo became known as "the duo with no real distinction between the boke and the tsukkomi".

History 
Though Arino and Hamaguchi attended different schools in their junior high years, they met and became friends through the same juku. They then went to the same senior high school, and upon graduation, Arino became a cook at a hotel. He decided to join Hamaguchi to form a comedy duo when Hamaguchi told him, "If you enter the entertainment world, you'll have a chance at marrying Noriko Sakai." They went with Shōchiku instead of the more famed Yoshimoto because they believed the competition in Yoshimoto was too great and thought they had a better chance at success in Shōchiku.

Their combo name at first was Arino & Hamaguchi, then Namekuji, before settling with Yowiko.
The name of the duo incorporates the hiragana "wi" character (ゐ) which has long been phased out of everyday use. While the character historically had a different pronunciation from the common "i" character (い), in modern use and for the many years leading up until it was phased out it was generally accepted that they were pronounced the same. Hence, while a kana transliteration of the combi name would be "Yowiko", a phonetic transliteration would be written "Yoiko".

Notes and references

Cosplayers
Japanese comedy duos
People from Osaka
Japanese YouTube groups